Ophiopsis is an extinct genus of prehistoric ray-finned fish belonging to the family Ophiopsidae. Specimens are known from the Tithonian-age Solnhofen Formation of Bavaria, Germany.

Taxonomy
The type species, Ophiopsis muensteri, was previously placed in Furo by several authors who mistakenly considered Ophiopsiella procera the Ophiopsis type species. However, Lane and Ebert (2015) noted that Ophiopsis originally included O. muensteri only when first erected by Agassiz (1834), so they re-assigned procera and some Ophiopsis species to the new genus Ophiopsiella.

See also

 Prehistoric fish
 List of prehistoric bony fish

References

Prehistoric ray-finned fish genera
Ionoscopiformes
Jurassic bony fish
Jurassic fish of Europe